Harry Bruce Daer (10 December 1918 – 19 December 1980) was an English cricketer.  Daer was a right-handed batsman who bowled right-arm medium pace.  He was born in Hammersmith, London.

Daer made his first-class debut for Essex against Worcestershire in the 1938 County Championship.  He played 7 further first-class fixtures in that season, playing one more first-class fixture in the following against Yorkshire at Bramall Lane, Sheffield. Daer very much adhered to the stereotype of a tailender, scoring just 60 runs in his 9 matches at a batting average of 6.66 and a high score of 17. More successful with the ball, Daer took 11 wickets at a bowling average of 35.18, with best figures of 3/21.

During World War II, Daer is mentioned in The London Gazette in January 1942 as a 2nd Lieutenant in the Royal Army Service Corps. He died in Plymouth, Devon on 19 December 1980.  Daer had survived his brother, Arthur, by five months.  He too played first-class cricket, having a more successful career at the highest domestic level.

References

External links
Harry Daer at Cricinfo
Harry Daer at CricketArchive

1918 births
1980 deaths
People from Hammersmith
Cricketers from Greater London
English cricketers
Essex cricketers
Royal Army Service Corps officers
British Army personnel of World War II